This article shows all participating team squads at the 2016 Women's European Water Polo Championship, held in Serbia from 10–22 January 2016.

























References

Women
Women's European Water Polo Championship
European Water Polo Championship squads
Euro